Soleus Running is a watch company that produces timing devices such as watches and cycling computers that use GPS and heart rate monitors. Its headquarters are located in Austin, Texas.

Etymology 
Soleus Running gets its name from the muscle located in the back part of the lower leg called the soleus. It begins right below the knee and runs down to the heel, and is involved in standing, walking and running. If not for the soleus, the body would fall forward.

Features 
Soleus Running sells a variety of devices ranging in style, features and price. Some of the watches have the ability to track an activity using GPS or a heart rate monitor.

Watches 
As of July 2014, the watches for sale on its website are:

Running:
 Dash
 Chicked
 P.R.
 Ultra Sole
 Stride
 Swift
 Tempo
 Flash
GPS:
 mini
 Fit
 Vibe
 Cross Country
 Sole
 Pulse
 Tour
Cycling:
 Draft

On the website, other items besides watches can be bought such as heart rate monitors, hats and headbands.

References

External 
 Homepage
 Shop

Companies based in Austin, Texas
Sports equipment